Beverly Wright is an American environmental justice scholar and the founder of the Deep South Center for Environmental Justice at Dillard University. Her research considers the environmental and health inequalities along the Mississippi River Chemical Corridor. Her awards and honours include the Environmental Protection Agency Environmental Justice Achievement Award.

Early life and education 
Wright was born in Louisiana, close to a highly polluted area that was known as ‘Cancer Alley,’. She has said that these childhood experiences were essential in shaping her research career. Wright studied sociology at Grambling State University. She moved to State University of New York at Buffalo as a graduate student. During her early research, Wright realised the racial disparities of cancer alley, noticing that the majority of people who lived along the polluted corridor were communities of colour. In an interview with Vice magazine Wright remarked, “All the birds had disappeared except for the crows. Screens on their windows were rusting and falling off in like three months. The air was so corrosive that the paint on their cars was being melted off,”. In 1991 she attended the People of Color Environmental Leadership Summit in Washington, D.C., where she met Damu Smith. Smith was the founder of the National Black Environmental Justice Network (NBEJN).

Career 
In 1992 Wright became the founder and executive director of the Deep South Center for Environmental Justice (DSCEJ) at Dillard University. The DSCEJ is a community–university partnership that investigates the impacts of environmental and health inequality along the Lower Mississippi River Industrial Center, which is so polluted that it became known as Cancer Alley. Her research combined population and demographic data with Toxics Release Inventory reports to better understand the correlations between race and pollution. She has shown that almost 80% of African-Americans live in polluted neighbourhoods. Wright and the DSCEJ developed an environmental justice curriculum for elementary schools in New Orleans. She worked on the National Institute of Environmental Health Sciences Minority Worker Training and Brownfields Minority Training Program, which helped people from underserved communities find careers in environmental and health sciences. Working with Robert D. Bullard, Wright popularised the Latinx term “the wrong complexion for protection”.

In the aftermath of Hurricane Katrina, Wright focussed on outreach and training programmes for the African-American community in New Orleans. She has worked to support displaced residents in returning to their homes, working with policy makers to address issues surrounding environmental restoration. Hurricane Katrina's flooding resulted in lead saturation in New Orleans soil. Wright showed that lead exposure was particularly bad in areas where there were significant numbers of Black families. She worked with American steelworkers to design a programme known as A Safe Way Back Home, which looks to clean abandoned homes and neighbourhoods of pollutants. The DSCEJ were involved with the response to the Deepwater Horizon oil spill.

Wright has worked with Mitch Landrieu on his Sustainable Energy and Environmental Taskforce. In 2017 she delivered expert testimony to the Council of the City of New Orleans to describe the risks associated with a Entergy gas power plant. In 2019 Entergy were fined $5 million for bringing in paid actors to influence to council's decision making process.

Academic service 
As Wright became more involved with environmental issues she started to realise how underrepresented Black people were at international climate events. In response, she organised a climate change conference for students at historically black colleges and universities, hosted at Dillard University and including a tour of East Plaquemines Parish. Wright is a member of the National Black Environmental Justice Network, which reformed in June 2020. With the newly reformed NBEJN Wright has been serving as an advisor for Joe Biden's climate emergency plan alongside Tamara Toles of 350.org.

Awards and honors 
 2006 Robert Wood Johnson Community Health Leadership Award
 2008 United States Environmental Protection Agency Environmental Justice Achievement Award 
 2009 Heinz Award
 2010 TheGrio 100 History Makers
 2011 Urban Affairs Association's SAGE Activist Scholar Award

Selected publications

Books

Book contributions 

 Wright, Beverly. “Black New Orleans Before and After Hurricane Katrina,” in 
 Wright, Beverly. “Washed Away by Hurricane Katrina: Rebuilding a ‘New’ New Orleans,” in 
 Wright, Beverly. “Living and Dying in Louisiana’s Cancer Alley,” Chapter 4 in 
 Wright, Beverly. “Just Sustainabilities: Development in an Unequal World,” Pp. 125–145 in Agyeman, J., Bullard, R.D., and Evans, B., Race, Politics, and Pollution: Environmental Justice in the Mississippi River Chemical Corridor, Earthscan Publication, MIT Press, 2003. 
 Bullard, Robert D. and Beverly Wright. “Environmental Justice for All,” Pp. 448–462, xiii, 609, in Understanding Prejudice and Discrimination. Plous, Scott (Ed.), New York, NY, US: McGraw-Hill, 2003.

Peer-reviewed articles

Monographs 

 Beverly Wright. Congressional Hearing Testimony, Subcommittee on Superfund and Environmental Health hearing entitled, “Oversight of the EPA’s Environmental Justice Programs." July 25, 2007.
 Beverly Wright. “Liability and Environmental Laws” Publication: Congressional Testimony Publish date: November 8, 2005.
 Bullard, Robert D. and  Beverly Wright. “The Color of Toxic Debris,” Pp.A9-A11 in The American Prospect – Demos, After Katrina: Redemption & Rebuilding, A report prepared for the Initiative for Regional and Community Transformation at Rutgers University and The McKnight Foundation (March 2009)
 Bullard, R., P. Mohai, R. Saha, and Wright, B, “Toxic Wastes and Race at Twenty,” United Church of Christ, Cleveland, OH (March 2007).
 Pastor, M., Bullard, R., Boyce, J., Fothergill, A., Morello-Frosch, R., Wright, B. Pp 20 & 26 “In the Wake of the Storm: Environment, Disaster, and Race after Katrina,” Russell Sage Foundation, NY (May 2006).
 Wright, B., Sarpong, D., Babefemi, A., “The Socioeconomic Impact of Air Toxics on Disproportionately Exposed Communities,” Deep South Center for Environmental Justice, New Orleans, LA (2001).

External links 

 DSCEJ page

References 

Environmental justice scholars
American women academics
Living people
Year of birth missing (living people)
Mississippi River
Grambling State University alumni
University at Buffalo alumni
Dillard University faculty
21st-century American women